Bifrenaria tyrianthina is a species of orchid.

tyrianthina